1166 Sakuntala, provisional designation , is a stony background asteroid from the central regions of the asteroid belt, approximately 26 kilometers in diameter. Discovered by Praskovjya Parchomenko at Simeiz Observatory in 1930, the asteroid was named after the figure of Shakuntala from an ancient Indian drama.

Discovery 

Sakuntala was discovered by Soviet astronomer Praskovjya Parchomenko at the Simeiz Observatory on the Crimean peninsula on 27 June 1930. Two night later, it was independently discovered by German astronomer Karl Reinmuth at Heidelberg Observatory. The body's observation arc begins at Uccle Observatory in May 1938, or 8 years after its official discovery observation at Simeiz.

Orbit and classification 

The asteroid is a background asteroid, that is not a member of any known asteroid family. Sakuntala orbits the Sun in the central main-belt at a distance of 2.0–3.1 AU once every 4.04 years (1,474 days). Its orbit has an eccentricity of 0.21 and an inclination of 19° with respect to the ecliptic.

Physical characteristics 

Sakuntala has been characterized as a stony S-type asteroid.

Rotation period 

Several rotational lightcurves of Sakuntala were obtained from photometric observations. Analysis of the best-rated lightcurve gave a rotation period of 6.29 hours with a brightness variation of 0.38 magnitude.

Other measurements gave a similar period of 6.2915 and 6.30 hours, respectively, while lightcurves with a period of larger than  hours are considered to be wrong.

Diameter and albedo 

According to the surveys carried out by the Infrared Astronomical Satellite IRAS, the Japanese Akari satellite and the NEOWISE mission of NASA's Wide-field Infrared Survey Explorer, Sakuntala measures between 22.70 and 29.249 kilometers in diameter  and its surface has an albedo between 0.185 and 0.6460.

The Collaborative Asteroid Lightcurve Link derives an albedo of 0.2914 and  a diameter of 25.78 kilometers based on an absolute magnitude of 9.9.

Naming 

This minor planet was named after the protagonist Shakuntala in the Sanskrit drama The Recognition of Shakuntala by Indian poet Kālidāsa. The drama is part of the Mahabharata, one of the major Sanskrit epics of ancient India.

The official naming citation was mentioned in The Names of the Minor Planets by Paul Herget in 1955.

References

External links 
 Asteroid Lightcurve Database (LCDB), query form (info )
 Dictionary of Minor Planet Names, Google books
 Asteroids and comets rotation curves, CdR – Observatoire de Genève, Raoul Behrend
 Discovery Circumstances: Numbered Minor Planets (1)-(5000) – Minor Planet Center
 
 

001166
Discoveries by Praskovjya Parchomenko
Named minor planets
19300627